McKenzie Lake is a lake in South Algonquin, Nipissing District and Hastings Highlands, Hastings County in Ontario, Canada. The settlement of McKenzie Lake is on the north shore of the lake. 

The primary inflow is Moore Creek at the east, arriving from the direction of Cross Lake, with another unnamed inflow at the northwest; there are several other secondary unnamed inflows, including one at the south arriving from North Chainy Lake and another arriving at the northeast from Turf Lake. The primary outflow, at the northern tip of the lake, is also Moore Creek, which heads north towards Moore Lake, and then flows via the Madawaska River and the Ottawa River to the Saint Lawrence River.

The lake is almost entirely in South Algonquin, Nipissing District, except for the southwestern tip, which is in Hastings Highlands, Hastings County, and thus straddles the traditional boundary between northern and southern Ontario, more specifically Nipissing District in Northeastern Ontario and Hastings County in Central Ontario.

The shore of the southwestern tip of the lake is part of Lake St. Peter Provincial Park, but none of the lake itself.

See also
List of lakes in Ontario

References

Lakes of Hastings County
Lakes of Nipissing District